Fenyes may refer to:
 Feneș (Fényes), a village of Armeniș, a commune in Romania
 Fenyes Estate, a historic two-acre estate complex located at 160-170 Orange Grove Boulevard in Pasadena, California

 people
 Adalbert Fenyes, a Hungarian entomologist
 Adolf Fényes (1867–1945), a Hungarian painter
 Imre Fényes Hungarian physicist
 Szabolcs Fényes (1912–1986), a Hungarian composer of film scores